Sergiu Ursu (born April 26, 1980) is a Romanian discus thrower. Originally from the Republic of Moldova, he transferred to compete for Romania from 2003 onwards. He represented his adopted country twice at both the World Championships in Athletics and European Athletics Championships.

He was banned for two years from February 2004 after a positive test for Nandrolone. In 2013 Urzu tested positive for Norandrosterone in an out of competition test, and was given another two-year sanction.

International competitions

See also
List of doping cases in athletics

References

1980 births
Living people
Doping cases in athletics
Moldovan male discus throwers
Romanian male discus throwers
Romanian sportspeople in doping cases
World Athletics Championships athletes for Romania